FK Brodarac is a football club based in New Belgrade, Serbia. They compete in the Serbian League Belgrade, the third tier of the national league system.

History
In the 2010–11 season, the club won the Belgrade Second League (Group Danube) and took promotion to the Belgrade First League. They spent the next six years in the fifth tier, before placing first in the 2016–17 campaign (Group A) and earning promotion to the fourth tier. The club subsequently won the Belgrade Zone League in the 2017–18 season, being promoted to the Serbian League Belgrade.

Honours
Belgrade Zone League (Tier 4)
 2017–18
Belgrade First League (Tier 5)
 2016–17 (Group A)
Belgrade Second League (Tier 6)
 2010–11 (Group Danube)
Belgrade Third League (Tier 7)
 2009–10 (Group A)

Seasons

Notable players
For a list of all FK Brodarac players with a Wikipedia article, see :Category:FK Brodarac players.

Managerial history

References

External links
 
 Club page at Srbijasport

1947 establishments in Serbia
Association football clubs established in 1947
Football clubs in Belgrade
Football clubs in Serbia
New Belgrade